Gibberula savignyi is a species of sea snail, a marine gastropod mollusk in the family Cystiscidae.

Description

Distribution

References

Cystiscidae
Gastropods described in 1869